The Indian Ocean Island Games is a quadrennial multi-sport event from Indian Ocean island nations. The Games was created by the International Olympic Committee (IOC) in 1977 and currently gather the island nations and territories of Mauritius, Seychelles, Comoros, Madagascar, Mayotte, Réunion and the Maldives. The number of athletes who participate has increased over the years, it went from 1000 athletes in 1979 to over 1500 participants in 2003 and 2007 and over 2000 participants in 2019.

Origins
From 1947 until 1963, a precursor called Indian Ocean Games Triangulaire was organized between Madagascar, Mauritius and Réunion. In 1963, a football match in Madagascar between Mauritius and Madagascar was abandoned at 1-1 after 54 minutes, and Madagascar declared themselves as winners of the tournament. After this match Mauritius refused to play and the tournament was not held again.

In 1974, the Regional Olympic Committee of Réunion decide to organise a multi-sport competition in the Indian Ocean. This was adopted by the International Olympic Committee in 1976. The competition was initially called the 'Indian Ocean Games', but the name was changed to the 'Indian Ocean Island Games' before the first games, without the participation of Sri Lanka, which was initially included.

The objectives of the games are to contribute to regional cooperation through the development of sport in the region; build friendship and mutual understanding between the peoples of the islands of the Indian Ocean, in the spirit of Olympism; allow athletes to have, every four years, a competition whose interest and level are commensurate with the real sport of the region; and create a regional event whose repercussions will ensure the development of infrastructure of countries in the area. In 2019 the games involve 7 islands, 14 disciplines and 2,000 athletes.

IOIG games
Five countries participated in the creation of the Games: Sri Lanka, Seychelles, Mauritius, Comoros and Reunion. They drafted the Charter of the Games.
Originally, the Games were to take place every four years, however this frequency was not observed from 1979 to 2003.

Participating countries

 Mauritius includes the islands of Rodrigues and Agaléga.
 In 2003, Mayotte participated together with Réunion as France Indian Ocean.

Events

  Athletics
  Badminton
  Basketball
  Boxing
  Cycling
  Football
  Handball
  Judo
  Karate
 Pétanque
  Rugby
  Sailing
  Swimming
  Table tennis
  Taekwondo
  Tennis
  Volleyball
  Weightlifting
  Wrestling

All-time medal table
As of 2015.

2003 France Indian Ocean medals have been counted for Réunion.

See also
 Indian Ocean Games Triangulaire

References

External links
  Official website of the 7th IOIG
 Official website of the 8th IOIG
 Official website of the 9th IOIG
 Official website of the 10th IOIG

 
History of the Indian Ocean
Multi-sport events in Africa
Multi-sport events in Asia
Recurring sporting events established in 1979